Anton Kunz (9 January 1915 – 17 December 2010) was an Austrian water polo player. He competed at the 1936 Summer Olympics and the 1952 Summer Olympics.

References

1915 births
2010 deaths
Austrian male water polo players
Olympic water polo players of Austria
Water polo players at the 1936 Summer Olympics
Water polo players at the 1952 Summer Olympics
Place of birth missing